1999 in Korea may refer to:
1999 in North Korea
1999 in South Korea